George Ian Davis (7 February 1939 – 25 February 2016) was an Australian politician.

He was born in Melbourne to George Davis and Viola, née Jackson. After attending South West Brunswick State School and Melbourne Church of England Grammar School, he received an Associate Diploma in Communications from the Royal Melbourne Institute of Technology. He worked as an engineer in 1961 before becoming sales manager with George Davis Glass, his father's firm, becoming partner in 1973 and managing director in 1981. In 1987 he became managing director of GBL Services Pty Ltd and Royston Holdings Pty Ltd. A member of the Liberal Party since 1973, he was elected to the Victorian Legislative Assembly in 1992 as the member for Essendon, but he was defeated in 1996.

References

1939 births
2016 deaths
Liberal Party of Australia members of the Parliament of Victoria
Members of the Victorian Legislative Assembly
Politicians from Melbourne
People educated at Melbourne Grammar School
RMIT University alumni